Mila Mountain, or Mira Mountain, or Milha Mountain, is a mountain in the Tibet Autonomous Region of China, roughly  by road northeast of Lhasa. The road pass that runs by its peak is one of the highest on China National Highway 318.

Location

The pass to the west of the mountain between Lhasa's Maizhokunggar County and Nyinchi's Gongbo'gyamda County is the highest point on the Nyingchi–Lhasa section of China National Highway 318.
In 2006 it was reported that local farmers could earn around 50 yuan, or US$6.25, daily from selling souvenirs at the Mila mountain pass.
In January 2015 it was announced that there were plans to build a tunnel for this part of the road later in the year. The tunnel opened to traffic on April 29, 2019 and is the highest road tunnel in the world.

Environment

The west of the mountain is dry and cool, while the east side is warmer and has more moisture, and therefore has richer vegetation.
The foothills have natural pastures and farmland. Trees include Yunnan pine, birch and fir.
Wildlife includes roe deer, antelope and bear.

References

Sources

Mountains of Tibet
Mountains of Lhasa